Teeshay Shah (also known as Teeshay) is an Indian actor, model, and host working in the Indian film industry Bollywood and regional cinema. He's known for his work as a host on the Zoom TV Channel show Planet Bollywood. He has written and directed short plays for Balancing Act Productions. He has explored his anchoring space as a sports presenter on Star Sports and hosted the show Match Point.

Career
Teeshay Shah has acted in the Bollywood movies Blood Money, Fast Forward, Yahaan Sabki Lagi Hai, The Perfect Girl, and the regional movie I Wish. Also, he has acted in the TV shows Yeh Hai Aashiqui, Love by Chance, Everest, Gumrah: End of Innocence, Yeh Hai Aashiqui Siyappa Ishq Ka, and Gulmohar Grand.

Ashutosh Gowariker, with whom Teeshay worked in Everest, praised his talent and referred him for the TV show Gulmohar Grand.

Teeshay's Hollywood journey started when he moved to Los Angeles in 2017. His film Hiraeth released on Amazon Prime in December 2019. He was last seen on the hit CBS Show Seal Team. Teeshay has also acted in numerous commercials in Hollywood.

Filmography

Film

Television

References

External links 
 
 

Year of birth missing (living people)
Living people
Indian male film actors